Frank Mosley is an American actor, director, producer, writer and editor.

Life and career
Mosley was born in Arlington, Texas. He graduated with a B.A. in English Literature and a minor in film from the University of Texas at Arlington. He is an alumnus of Berlinale Talents. He received the 2013 Visionary Award at Fort Worth Weekly.

Mosley directed his debut feature film, Hold, premiered at the Dallas International Film Festival in 2010. In 2014, His second feature film, Her Wilderness, premiered at the Sidewalk Film Festival. He also directed his trilogy of shorts film, Spider Veins, Casa De Mi Madre and Parthenon. He was selected for a retrospective of his work by Spectacle Theater and Kinoscope.

Select filmography

Actor

Awards and nominations

References

External links
 
 

American male film actors
American male television actors
American film producers
21st-century American male actors
American film directors
American male screenwriters
American film editors
Living people
Year of birth missing (living people)